The Santa Maria River is an intermittent stream located in western Arizona.  It is a primary tributary of the Bill Williams River and one of the main sources of inflow for Alamo Lake.  The river forms a portion of the boundary between Mohave and La Paz counties.

Course 

From the confluence, the river flows in a generally southwesterly direction through the rugged Arrastra Mountain Wilderness area (Poachie Range–Black Mountains). The river accepts a number of smaller, intermittent streams throughout its length.

The river joins the Big Sandy River to form the Bill Williams River just upstream of Alamo Lake.  During periods of heavy rainfall, the lake may extend beyond the confluence point, during which period the Santa Maria empties directly into the lake rather than joining the Big Sandy River.

The remainder is ephemeral and runs only during periods of heavy rain.

See also
 List of rivers of Arizona

References

External links 
 Realtime monitoring of stream discharge

Rivers of Arizona
Rivers of Mohave County, Arizona
Rivers of La Paz County, Arizona